Shui-an Temple is a metro station on the Green Line operated by Taichung Metro in Nantun District, Taichung, Taiwan.

The station name is taken from Shui-an Temple, which is located nearby. Initially, the station was known as Wenxin Daye Station (文心大業站), but was renamed on August 18, 2020.

Station layout

References 

Taichung Metro
Railway stations in Taichung
Railway stations opened in 2020